The Palais de Justice tram stop is located on line  of the tramway de Bordeaux.

Situation
The station is located by Maréchal Juin Boulevard in Bordeaux. The change to ground-level power supply (APS) at this station allows an absence of overhead lines in downtown Bordeaux.

Junction
 TBC bus routes:

Close by

 Palais de Justice, the old building (Place de la République) and the new one (modern architecture; designed by Richard Rogers)
Château du Hâ
École nationale de la magistrature, National School for Judges
 Hôpital Saint-André (CHU de Bordeaux), Bordeau University Hospital

See also
 TBC
 Tramway de Bordeaux

Bordeaux tramway stops
Tram stops in Bordeaux
Railway stations in France opened in 2003